The 1963 Sam Houston State Bearkats football team represented Sam Houston State Teachers College (now known as Sam Houston State University) as a member of the Lone Star Conference (LSC)  during the 1963 NAIA football season. Led by 12th-year head coach Paul Pierce, the Bearkats compiled an overall record of 4–3–1 with a mark of 2–3–1 in conference play, and finished fifth in the LSC.

Schedule

References

Sam Houston State
Sam Houston Bearkats football seasons
Sam Houston State Bearkats football